Misfits of Science is an American science fiction comedy-drama television series created by James D. Parriott that aired on NBC from October 4, 1985, to February 21, 1986.

Plot
The series featured super-powered humans and their madcap adventures. The team is formed by Dr. Billy Hayes, a research scientist at the Humanidyne Institute who specializes in "human anomalies". He works with shrinking Dr. Elvin "El" Lincoln, and together they recruit electrically powered Johnny Bukowski, a rock-and-roll musician, and Gloria Dinallo, a telekinetic teenager.

Production 
A double-length TV pilot and 15 additional episodes were produced; however, one episode did not air before the show was cancelled due to low ratings.

The name "Misfits of Science" and other conceptual ideas were the brainchild of then-president of NBC Entertainment, Brandon Tartikoff. He explained of the series "We'll rely on the National Enquirer for story ideas. It's loosely inspired by the dynamics we saw in Ghostbusters... sort of a kick-back, Friday type of show."

The ninth episode was the first paid writing job for Tim Kring, who later originated and produced the thematically similar Heroes in 2006.

Title sequence 
The main title sequence and its theme song were unusual for TV shows of the era. Donald Todd, head writer and story editor, described them as follows:

Cast and characters 
 Dean Paul Martin as Dr. Billy Hayes, the leader of the team (who has no superpowers). He is a young research scientist at the Humanidyne Institute who specializes in "human anomalies" and a fast-talking but good-hearted schemer full of boyish enthusiasm who often gets the team into as much trouble as he gets them out of. Although easily distracted whenever an attractive woman walks by, he is honestly interested in getting involved in a serious relationship with Jane Miller even after she showed up pregnant by another man.
 Kevin Peter Hall as Dr. Elvin "El" Lincoln, Billy's colleague and close friend. A recurring joke after such transformations is that he always has to put on the tiny change of clothes he carries with him for his small size. The character is shy and struggles socially, and despite being so tall, he is a very bad basketball player.
 Mark Thomas Miller as Johnny "Johnny B" Bukowski, a rock and roll musician who was electrically shocked on stage which resulted in disturbing electrical powers. He continually drains any electrically charged items in his surroundings, forcing him to live in isolation. He wears sunglasses because his eyes glow when he is fully charged. He can throw lightning bolts forcefully and run at superhuman speed, easily outracing in one episode a parody of the Six Million Dollar Man, but he is vulnerable to water which short circuits him and burns his skin. He is a big Chuck Berry fan.
 Courteney Cox as Gloria Dinallo, a troubled telekinetic teenager with a history of juvenile delinquency and a mother in a mental institution who claims Gloria's father is from outer space. She has a crush on Johnny. Gloria can only use her telekinesis on things that she can see: using a blindfold on her renders her powerless.
 Diane Civita as Miss Nance, the scientists' secretary. Although she usually seems more interested in doing her nails, going on her coffee break, and watching her soap operas, she is actually the one who keeps their department running and is always there at the end of the series to turn off the lights and say goodnight to the rabbits in their cages.
 Jennifer Holmes as Jane Miller, Gloria's probation officer. Although attracted to Billy, she is often put off by his eccentric behavior. Her character appears only in the earlier episodes.
 Max Wright as Dick Stetmeyer, the uptight director of the Humanidyne Institute. Unlike the other cast members, he isn't actually considered to be one of the Misfits.
 Mickey Jones as Arnold "Beef"/"Ice Man" Beifneiter, who got his power to freeze anything he touches from placing himself in an experimental cryogenic cold storage unit back in the year of 1937 due to grief caused by the loss of his beloved Amelia Earhart. The team drives around in an ice cream truck (International Metro Mite M-800) because the lumbering and now rather simple-minded Ice Man dies if he gets too warm, so they keep him in the freezer. Beef only appears in the pilot episode due to legal objections from Marvel Comics, who publish a similarly-named character in X-Men, but the characters continue to use the ice cream truck.

Episodes

International broadcast
In France, the series was known as Superminds, in Germany, as Die Spezialisten unterwegs (The Specialists On The Way), in Brazil, as "Curto-Circuito" ("Short Circuit"), in Mexico, Colombia, Peru and rest of Latin America as Los Cientificos Rebeldes (The Rebel Scientists).

DVD releases
On January 25, 2008, the series was released in Germany as a 5-disc DVD box set (Region 2) with all episodes (including the final episode, which was originally unaired on NBC but broadcast in Germany) with both English and German audios and German subtitles. The release was entitled “Die Spezialisten Unterwegs”, translates literally to “The Specialists On The Go”.

On September 19, 2012, the series was released on DVD in France as Superminds.

References

External links
 
 Misfits of Science at internationalhero.co.uk
 Misfits of Science at the Friday @ 8/7 Central blog

1980s American comedy-drama television series
1980s American comic science fiction television series
1985 American television series debuts
1986 American television series endings
American superhero comedy television series
English-language television shows
NBC original programming
Television series by Universal Television
Television shows filmed in California
Television shows set in California